Teófilo Forero Castro (died February 27, 1989) was a Colombian politician and trade unionist. A metalworker by profession, Forero became the National Organizing Secretary of the Colombian Communist Party. He also founded the trade union centre Confederación Sindical de Trabajadores de Colombia (CSTC). He was assassinated on February 27, 1989, one of several killings directed against the leftist Patriotic Union at the time. A mobile column of the guerilla group Revolutionary Armed Forces of Colombia was named after him.

References

Assassinated Colombian politicians
Colombian trade unionists
Colombian Communist Party politicians
1989 deaths
Year of birth missing